San Marcos is an island located in the northern portion of Baja California Sur, México. It faces the town of Santa Rosalía on the Gulf of California near Isla Tortuga. The only town on the island is also named San Marcos. The island has a land area of 28.748 km² (11.100 sq mi), the 18th-largest island in Mexico. Its population as of the 2005 census was 425 inhabitants. It is part of the Mulegé Municipality.

Geography 

Access
A 1,125 meter long private-use dirt airstrip is located on the South coast of Isla San Marcos. Small boats located in San Bruno ferry people to the island, and back from the island

Attractions 
Fishing is the main attraction, being roughly in the middle of the Gulf of California.

World War 2
During World War II the area was heavily mined for gypsum which had many uses in the war.

References

Islands of Baja California Sur